Ladies Courageous (also called Fury in the Sky in a 1950 Realart re-release) is a 1944 war film based on the novel Looking For Trouble (1941) by Virginia Spencer Cowles. Directed by John Rawlins, the film stars Loretta Young and Geraldine Fitzgerald. It tells the story of the paramilitary Women's Auxiliary Ferrying Squadron formed in the United States during World War II. Film historians and scholars consider Ladies Courageous an à-clef story of famed aviator Jacqueline Cochran and test pilot Nancy Harkness Love's work to mobilize women pilots to contribute to the war effort.

Plot
In World War II, Roberta Harper (Loretta Young) leads the Women's Auxiliary Ferrying Squadron (WAFS), made up of 25 women who ferry aircraft across the United States allowing male pilots to be released for combat service. Despite their success, her commanding officer, Colonel Andy Brennan (Richard Fraser) says that her pilots may not be able to handle dangerous missions. Roberta also has to contend with her impetuous sister, Virginia "Virgie" Alford (Geraldine Fitzgerald), and other concerns such as an affair involving Nadine Shannon (Diana Barrymore), one of her pilots. Famous aerobatic pilot Gerry Vail (Anne Gwynne), a member of "The Flying Vails", is afraid that her 100th flight may be her last, a fate that befell her father and brothers during their 100th performance. Roberta assures her that her 100th flight has already taken place.

The WAFS soon have a real tragedy when one of their own, Jill Romilly (Lois Collier), dies in a crash. With the depression that sets in among the women, a top-secret mission to deliver aircraft to "Easy Queen Island," a front line air base in the Pacific, appears to be the way to prove their worth to their army superiors. Roberta is mortified when publicity-seeking Virgie crashes her aircraft on purpose and is "washed-out" by her older sister. Roberta accepts the blame for tolerating Virgie's reckless behavior, and resigns from the WAFS. She then learns her husband Tommy (Phillip Terry) is "missing in action". Virgie tries to make things right, but after stealing an aircraft to fly to army headquarters in Washington, crashes and nearly kills herself.

Although the WAFS seems to be in disarray, a surprise announcement by Brigadier General Wade (Samuel S. Hinds), a high-ranking Pentagon officer, changes everything. He informs Roberta, who has recently returned as their leader, that the unit is to be part of the military as the Women Airforce Service Pilots (WASPS). The ferry mission to the Pacific has also been reinstated. As the squadron readies for their new mission, Roberta is reunited with her husband, who returned home safely. The squadron is finally able to take off and head to the Pacific to deliver much-needed combat aircraft, including the latest fighter and bomber aircraft from American factories.

Cast
 Loretta Young as Roberta Harper
 Geraldine Fitzgerald as [Virginia] "Virgie" Alford
 Diana Barrymore as Nadine Shannon
 Anne Gwynne as Gerry Vail
 Evelyn Ankers as Wilhelmina Von Kronk
 Phillip Terry as Major Tommy Harper
 David Bruce as Frank Garrison
 Lois Collier as Jill Romilly
 June Vincent as Mary Frances Wright
 Samuel S. Hinds as Brig. General Wade
 Richard Fraser as Colonel Andy Brennan
 Frank Jenks as "Snapper" Anthony Walgreen
 Janet Shaw as "Bee Jay"
 Kane Richmond as Alex Anderson

Production
Ladies Courageous featured the onscreen notice, "... sanctioned by the United States Army Air Forces as the official motion-picture story of the Women's Auxiliary Ferrying Squadron, now known as the Wasps, Women's Air Force Service Pilots." The genesis of the film came in 1942 when Colonel Mason Wright, the head of the War Department Bureau of Public Relations motion picture branch, contacted producer Walter Wanger to make a film about the WAFS. After approval of the script, under the working title of "When Ladies Fly", pre-production began with the choice of Loretta Young, under contract at Universal Pictures, as the lead, with Geraldine Fitzgerald, on loan from Warner Bros., playing her younger sister. While director John Rawlins was about to begin principal photography, the United States Army Air Forces reviewed its commitment to the project, demanding major script revisions and threatening to have the film closed down. Although the initial script had been approved, the USAAF was worried the film treatment was unsympathetic to women and that the film subject was no longer relevant, since on August 5, 1943, the Women Airforce Service Pilots (WASPS) had absorbed the earlier organization.

Wanger argued that considerable financial commitment had already been made, but faced with opposition from the military, relented and agreed to the 13 changes that were demanded. Principal photography for Ladies Courageous at both Universal Pictures Studios and location shooting at the Long Beach Army Air Field in California began on August 23 and continued to early November 1943. With the renewed cooperation of the USAAF, a large number of operational aircraft were made available, including Boeing B-17 Flying Fortress and Consolidated B-24 Liberator bombers, as well as Curtiss P-40 Warhawk, North American P-51 Mustang and Republic P-47 Thunderbolt fighters and North American T-6 Texan trainers.

The film was the first screenplay of prolific radio writer Doris Gilbert, daughter of Louis Wolfe Gilbert.

Reception

By the time the troubled production reached the screen, Ladies Courageous was already the subject of a congressional review of the formation of the Women Airforce Service Pilots. The film also struck a discordant tone with viewers and critics alike, who were not pleased with what Variety characterized as "... over-theatricalized" portrayals. Reviewer Thomas M. Pryor emphatically noted in The New York Times that "... 'Ladies Courageous' represents a very curious compliment to the WAFS on the part of its producer, Walter Wanger, and the Army Air Force, which sanctioned and participated in the making of the picture, now at Loew's Criterion. Such hysterics, such bickering and generally unladylike, nay unpatriotic, conduct on the part of a supposedly representative group of American women this reviewer has never before seen upon the screen."

A group of WASPS fliers happened upon the film being shown in an Orlando, Florida, theater in 1944, and were astonished at the soap-opera histrionics exhibited by the characters on screen. They immediately dubbed the film "Ladies Outrageous".

After Ladies Courageous recorded a net loss of $186,691, it was reissued postwar as Fury in the Sky in 1950, but did not fare much better with the public. More recent evaluations ranged from a lukewarm Leonard Maltin review - "Well-meant idea fails because of hackneyed script and situations ..." – to noted aviation film historian Bruce Orriss, who dismissed the film as "... little more than an embarrassment to the members of this earnest group of pilots."

See also
 United States Transportation Command
 United States home front during World War II
 American propaganda during World War II

References

Notes

Citations

Bibliography

 Bernstein, Matthew. Walter Wagner: Hollywood Independent. St. Paul, Minnesota: Minnesota Press, 2000. .
 Dick, Bernard F. Hollywood Madonna: Loretta Young. Jackson, Mississippi: University Press of Mississippi, 2011. .
 Haynsworth, Leslie and David Toomey. Amelia Earhart's Daughters. New York: William Morrow and Company, 1998. .
 Koppes, Clayton R. and Gregory D. Black. Hollywood Goes to War: How Politics, Profits and Propaganda Shaped World War II Movies. New York: The Free Press, 1987. .
 Merryman Molly. Clipped Wings: The Rise and Fall of the Women Airforce Service Pilots (WASPS) of World War II. New York: New York University Press, 2001. .
 Orriss, Bruce. When Hollywood Ruled the Skies: The Aviation Film Classics of World War II. Hawthorne, California: Aero Associates Inc., 1984. .

External links
 
 

1944 films
American drama films
American aviation films
American black-and-white films
Films scored by Dimitri Tiomkin
Films based on American novels
Films directed by John Rawlins
Universal Pictures films
World War II aviation films
World War II films made in wartime
Films produced by Walter Wanger
1944 drama films
1940s English-language films